Rensonia is a genus of Mesoamerican plants in the tribe Heliantheae within the family Asteraceae.

The genus is named for Salvadoran botanist Carlos Renson.

Species
The only known species is Rensonia salvadorica, native to Mesoamerica (Costa Rica, El Salvador, Guatemala, Chiapas, Oaxaca, Veracruz)

References

Heliantheae
Monotypic Asteraceae genera
Flora of Central America
Flora of Veracruz
Flora of Southwestern Mexico
Flora of Southeastern Mexico